Norman Earl Evans (born September 28, 1942) is a former American football player.  He played professionally as an offensive tackle for 14 seasons, first in the American Football League (AFL) and later in the National Football League (NFL). Evans is the only player in NFL history to be chosen in two expansion drafts.  The Miami Dolphins took Evans from the Houston Oilers in the 1966 AFL Expansion draft.  He played 10 seasons with Miami.  Evans was also chosen by the Seattle Seahawks in the 1976 NFL Expansion Draft and played three seasons there.  He was selected to two Pro Bowls and played in three Super Bowls, all with the Dolphins.

Norman was born in Santa Fe, New Mexico, but his football playing days began in Donna, Texas, then a small town of 7,500 people with a 2A football team.

See also
 List of American Football League players

References

1942 births
Living people
American football offensive tackles
Houston Oilers players
Miami Dolphins players
Seattle Seahawks players
TCU Horned Frogs football players
American Conference Pro Bowl players
People from Donna, Texas
Sportspeople from Santa Fe, New Mexico
Players of American football from Texas
American Football League players